Antón Lizardo is a fishing town (2005 population 4,586)
located 23 km (14 mi) in the Mexican state of Veracruz. 
It is located south of the port city of Veracruz, near Boca del Río, in the municipality of Alvarado.

In January 1860, the small naval Battle of Anton Lizardo occurred here between Mexican rebels and United States Navy warships. Since 11 November 1952, it is the home of the Heroica Escuela Naval Militar, the country's Naval Academy.

Antón Lizardo offers a fairly long beach with fine, dark, hard-packed sand and calm shallow waters that make up part of the Veracruz Coral Reef System. These beaches are convenient for transportation for scuba diving at the coral reefs, but offer no protection from the wind or from drivers. The beaches here, as in Veracruz and Boca del Río, are packed during national holidays and Carnaval. It is a very small town, it does not have many people, but it is a very quiet place to vacation

References

Populated places in Veracruz
Beaches of Veracruz